James Edward Young (born January 18, 1926) is an American physicist who was the first black tenured faculty member in the Department of Physics at Massachusetts Institute of Technology. He was a founding member of the National Society of Black Physicists and a mentor for Shirley Ann Jackson.

Early life and education 
Young was born in Wheeling, West Virginia. He attended Lincoln High School and graduated in 1941. Young studied physics at Howard University. He was appointed as a physics instructor at the Hampton Institute, whilst simultaneously completing a master's degree in acoustical engineering at Howard University. He moved to the Massachusetts Institute of Technology as a research assistant in 1949 and earned a Doctorate in Science in 1953. His early research considered the propagation of noise in pipes. He was a member of Sigma Pi Sigma, Sigma Xi and Beta Kappa Chi. After earning his PhD, Young joined Los Alamos National Laboratory, where he began working on particle physics. He investigated pions and deuteron stripping theory.

Research and career 
Young researched and taught theoretical particle physics, critical phenomena and nuclear physics in the MIT Center for Theoretical Physics. He earned tenure in the Department of Physics at the Massachusetts Institute of Technology in 1969, and was the first black member of faculty to do so. He was interested in the intermediate structures in nuclear reactions. He contributed to several textbooks, including Nuclear, Particle and Many Body Physics and the Intermediate Structure in Nuclear Reactions. Young was the doctoral advisor for Shirley Ann Jackson, the first African-American woman to earn a PhD at MIT, as well as Sylvester James Gates.

In 1977 Young was a founding member of the National Society of Black Physicists. He founded the society with Ronald E. Mickens, with whom he had previously discussed senior Black physicists who became role models for their students. They hosted a meeting at Fisk University to celebrate these "elders", including Halson V. Eagleson, Donald Edwards and John McNeile Hunter. The National Society of Black Physicists emerged from these meetings, an independent society led by African-Americans who "created and developed activities and programs for themselves".

Personal life 
Young married E. Elaine Hunter, with whom he has one child, James E. Young III.

References 

MIT Department of Physics alumni
MIT Center for Theoretical Physics faculty
Howard University alumni
African-American scientists
1926 births
Living people
Members of the National Society of Black Physicists
21st-century African-American people
20th-century African-American people
African-American physicists